Carl Emil Österman (11 January 1870, Västra Vingåker Parish, Södermanland – 8 March 1927, Stockholm) was a Swedish painter, illustrator and academician. His twin brother, Bernhard, was also an artist.

Biography
His father was a dye master. From 1890 to 1893, he studied at the Royal Swedish Academy of Fine Arts and was awarded the Royal Medal for his depiction of the murder of Axel von Fersen. While there, he also took lessons in etching from Axel Tallberg. From 1894 to 1898, thanks to several scholarships, he was able to visit Italy, the Netherlands, Belgium, France, Germany and Spain. He became a member of the Academy in 1900 and, from 1901 to 1908, taught education there. In 1914, he was appointed Vice-Professor of Painting. He served as Sweden's official Commissioner at art exhibitions in Munich in 1905, 1909 and 1913, as well as in Vienna (1910) and Brighton (1911). 

Like his brother, he became a well known portrait painter.

A major retrospective of his work was held at the Royal Academy in 1928. His works may be seen at the Nationalmuseum, Nordiska museet, Stockholms stadshus and the Uppsala University Library. He was buried at the Norra begravningsplatsen near Stockholm.

References

Other sources

Svenskt konstnärslexikon Part V, pgs. 821-822, Allhems Förlag, Malmö

External links 

Biography @ the Lexikonett Amanda

1870 births
1927 deaths
People from Vingåker Municipality
Swedish painters
Swedish portrait painters
Swedish twins
Burials at Norra begravningsplatsen